Eukaryotic translation initiation factor 5 is a protein that in humans is encoded by the EIF5 gene.

EIF5 is a GTPase-activating protein.

References

External links
 Cap-dependent translation initiation from Nature Reviews Microbiology. A good image and overview of the function of initiation factors
 PDBe-KB provides an overview of all the structure information available in the PDB for Human Eukaryotic translation initiation factor 5 (EIF5)

Further reading